Amador Transit is a public transit agency serving Amador County, California. There are routes within the county as well as a commuter route to and from Downtown Sacramento.

References

Public transportation in California
Amador County, California
Transportation in Amador County, California